Michelle Josef (born March 21, 1953), formerly Bohdan Hluszko, is a Canadian musician and transgender activist.

Under her former name, Josef was already established as one of Canada's leading session drummers, and has continued her career in music. She has appeared on albums by Prairie Oyster, Doug Sahm, Jo-El Sonnier, Wild Strawberries, Sylvia Tyson, Long John Baldry, Scott B. Sympathy, Big Rude Jake, and Sharon, Lois and Bram. She is a member of Canadian roots super group Hey Stella!

In 1998, she received a Canadian Country Music Award for drummer of the year.

References

External links
Michelle Josef

1953 births
Living people
Canadian country drummers
Canadian women country singers
Canadian country singer-songwriters
Canadian LGBT musicians
Transgender singers
Transgender women
Canadian women drummers
Transgender women musicians